WMTC can refer to:

 WMTC-FM, a radio station (99.9 FM) licensed to serve Vancleve, Kentucky, United States
 WMTC (AM), a defunct radio station (730 AM) formerly licensed to serve Vancleve, Kentucky
 World Motorcycle Test Cycle or WMTC - an initiative stipulating test methods for measuring the fuel consumption of motorcycles